The 1950–51 season was the 50th year of competitive football played by Southampton F.C., the club's 24th season as members of the Football League, and their 22nd playing in the Second Division. The Saints finished the campaign in 12th place in the league table, having gained 43 from a possible 84 points with 15 wins, 13 draws and 14 losses. The club also competed in the FA Cup, losing in the fourth round at First Division side Sunderland after a third round replay win over Notts County.

After another frustrating season in which they missed out on promotion only on goal average, Southampton saw some key players depart in the summer of 1950. First-choice goalkeeper Ian Black joined former manager Bill Dodgin at Fulham, with Hugh Kelly taking his place in exchange. He was followed by mainstay full-back Bill Rochford, who many fans had expected to succeed Dodgin as manager, to Colchester United; Norman Kirkman joined from Leicester City in his place. Also leaving the club prior to the start of the league campaign were José Gallego, George Smith, and Bobby Veck. It wasn't until just after the league had started, however, that the biggest transfer of the season took place – star forward Charlie Wayman, who had been the side's top scorer for the last three seasons, requested a move to Preston North End for a "substantial fee" and the exchange of Eddy Brown in return. Partway through the year, Southampton signed Scottish goalkeeper John Christie from Ayr United.

During the season, 27 players appeared for Southampton in all competitions. Left-half Joe Mallett featured in more games than any other player, being ever present in both the league and FA Cup with 44 appearances. New centre-forward Eddy Brown finished as Southampton's top scorer, with 20 goals in the league and two in the FA Cup. The club attracted an average home league attendance at The Dell of 21,770. The highest league attendance was 27,306 against league leaders (and eventual champions) Preston North End on 31 March 1951; the lowest was 13,922 against bottom-two side Chesterfield on 28 April 1951, the day of the 1951 FA Cup Final.

Second Division

Season summary
Southampton kicked off the 1950–51 league campaign with a six-game unbeaten run, including a 2–1 opening day win over Barnsley, a tight 1–0 victory over fellow 1949–50 promotion contenders Sheffield United, and a late 1–0 away win over Luton Town. Despite finding themselves third in the league table and immediately vying for a promotion challenge, the absence of centre-forward Charlie Wayman early on had meant that goals were hard to find. In the second week of September, the club lost their star striker to Preston North End, who were looking to return to the top flight after being relegated two seasons previously, with the Lancashire side paying a "substantial fee" and sending Eddy Brown to take his place in the Saints squad. Brown's debut saw the team beating Leeds United 2–0, but over the next month four losses in five fixtures saw the Saints dropping as low as ninth in the table. Successive 1–0 home wins over Notts County and Bury ensured the team remained competitive in the top half of the league.

In the run-up to Christmas, Southampton picked up their form to move up the table. During November, the side picked up a hard-fought 5–4 win against Coventry City, before surprising recently-relegated Manchester City at Maine Road with a 3–2 win, to move back up to sixth in the Second Division table. Despite a 2–2 draw with Leicester City in the middle of a winning streak, in December the Saints continued their strong run with another 3–2 away win over struggling Chesterfield, followed by hard-fought 1–0 and 2–1 wins over Barnsley and fellow promotion contenders Sheffield United, respectively. Going into Christmas, the team had climbed all the way to the top of the table. Their run of good form ended on Boxing Day, however, when they suffered their biggest defeat of the season losing 0–4 to 19th-placed Brentford, with all four goals scored by prolific frontman Billy Dare. The loss saw the Saints drop four places to fifth in the table, and would mark the last time all season they occupied a promotion spot.

After ascending to the top of the table in December, the Saints fell quickly to the bottom half of the league when they went nine games without a win between Boxing Day 1950 and mid-March 1951. Going into the new year, Southampton suffered defeats at the hands of Leeds United, Swansea Town, Hull City and Birmingham City, as well as dropping points at home to Luton Town and West Ham United. A season-high 5–1 thrashing of bottom-placed Grimsby Town was enough to keep Southampton's Second Division status safe, but the team's form continued to suffer as they failed to pick up wins over sides much lower in the league table – losing at the end of March to both Queens Park Rangers and Bury. In their home fixture against Preston on 31 March, the Saints came back from 1–3 down to draw 3–3 with the league leaders (the point securing their promotion), preventing the eventual champions from breaking the Football League record of 14 consecutive wins. Six points from their final ten (including another win over Manchester City) meant that Southampton finished 12th in the Second Division table – disappointing when compared with 1948–49 and 1949–50, both of which almost ended in promotion to the First Division.

Final league table

Results by matchday

Match reports

FA Cup
Notts County 
Southampton entered the 1950–51 FA Cup in the third round, drawn away against fellow Second Division side Notts County. The travelling Saints quickly took control of the game, opening the scoring after 11 minutes when Eddy Brown beat several defenders to convert from close range. Just four minutes later, Brown doubled his (and his side's) tally when he followed up from a Jack Edwards header that ricocheted off the crossbar. Notts County came close to responding before the half-time break through Bob Crookes and Tom Johnston, but they were denied by Saints goalkeeper Hugh Kelly and defender Bill Ellerington, respectively. Early in the second half, it was the away side that asserted its dominance once again, with Brown almost scoring a hat-trick within seconds of the restart, before Eric Day scored off the post following a setup that involved both Brown and Ted Bates. County did finally score through Frank Broome just before the hour mark, but a few minutes later Day scored his second and Southampton's fourth with a "marvellous individual effort" in which he beat multiple defenders. Both Brown and Day came close to completing hat-tricks, but the final two goals came courtesy of a Leon Leuty penalty and a late Alex Simpson goal.

Sunderland 
In the fourth round, Southampton travelled north again to face frequent FA Cup rivals, Sunderland of the First Division. Much of the first half was an even affair, with both sides enjoying chances on goal, but it was the hosts who broke the deadlock just three minutes before half-time, when Dickie Davis followed up a shot from Trevor Ford that had been saved by Hugh Kelly. The other side of the break, Davis scored a second for the Black Cats in the 51st minute, taking advantage of a poor clearance off the goal line by Ellerington. Despite mounting several attacks late on, Southampton were unable to respond.

Additional friendlies
Southampton played a number of friendly matches during the 1950–51 season. The first, on 31 October 1950, saw the Saints hosting local Third Division South side Bournemouth & Boscombe Athletic in the Dell's first ever floodlit fixture, which ended goalless after a one-hour playtime. The second exhibition, on 10 February 1951, also ended in a draw as the Saints held top-flight Middlesbrough to a 1–1 finish – Southampton's goal was scored by Frank Dudley, who was making his first appearance for the club after signing from Leeds United. The Saints played Bournemouth & Boscombe again two weeks after the Middlesbrough fixture, this time at Dean Court, beating them 3–2 thanks to a hat-trick for Dudley. A 0–1 loss at Midland League side Boston United in April was followed by a 2–0 win over a Jersey XI side in May, a few days after the conclusion of the league campaign. A couple of weeks later, Southampton hosted two exhibitions as part of the celebrations for the Festival of Britain – first, they beat Swiss side Servette 3–0 thanks to goals from Brown, George Curtis and Eric Day, followed by a 3–3 draw with Danish side Kjøbenhavns Boldklub – all three goals coming from Brown.

Squad statistics

Most appearances

Top goalscorers

Transfers

Footnotes

References

Bibliography

Southampton F.C. seasons
Southampton